Fabian Gottlieb Thaddeus von Bellingshausen ( – ) was a cartographer, explorer, and naval officer of the Russian Empire, who ultimately rose to the rank of admiral. He participated in the first Russian circumnavigation of the globe, and subsequently became a leader of another circumnavigation expedition that discovered the continent of Antarctica. Like Otto von Kotzebue and Adam Johann von Krusenstern, Bellingshausen belonged to the cohort of prominent Baltic German navigators who helped Russia launch its naval expeditions.

Bellingshausen was born in the Estonian island of Saaremaa (Ösel). He started his service in the Russian Baltic Fleet, and after distinguishing himself joined the first Russian circumnavigation of the Earth in 1803–1806, serving on the merchant ship Nadezhda under the captaincy of Adam Johann von Krusenstern. After the journey, he published a collection of maps of the newly explored areas and islands of the Pacific Ocean. Subsequently, he commanded several ships of the Baltic and Black Sea Fleets.

As a prominent cartographer, Bellingshausen was appointed to command the Russian circumnavigation of the globe in 1819–1821, intended to explore the Southern Ocean and to find land in the proximity of the South Pole. Mikhail Lazarev prepared the expedition and was made Bellingshausen's second-in-command and the captain of the sloop Mirny, while Bellingshausen himself commanded the sloop Vostok. During this expedition, Bellingshausen and Lazarev became the first explorers to see the land of Antarctica on 27 January 1820 (New Style), disproving James Cook's contention that it was impossible to find land in the southern ice-fields. They circumnavigated the continent twice and never lost each other from view. The expedition discovered and named Peter I, Zavodovski, Leskov, Alexander, and Visokoi Islands, the Antarctic Peninsula, and made other discoveries in the tropical waters of the Pacific.

Made counter admiral on his return, Bellingshausen participated in the Russo-Turkish War of 1828–1829. Promoted to vice admiral, he again served in the Baltic Fleet in the 1830s, and from 1839 he was the military governor of Kronstadt, where he died. In 1831, he published the book on his Antarctic travels, called Double Investigation of the Southern Polar Ocean and the Voyage Around the World.

Early life and career

His paternal family had Holsteinish origins; the surname Bellingshausen was first recorded in Lübeck. He enlisted as a cadet in the Imperial Russian Navy at the age of ten. After graduating from the Kronstadt naval academy at age eighteen, Bellingshausen rapidly rose to the rank of captain.

First Russian circumnavigation

A great admirer of Cook's voyages, Bellingshausen served from 1803 in the first Russian circumnavigation of the Earth. He was one of the officers of the vessel Nadezhda ("Hope"), commanded by Adam Johann von Krusenstern.

The mission was completed in 1806. After the journey, Bellingshausen published a collection of maps of the newly explored areas and islands of the Pacific Ocean.

Service as captain

Bellingshausen's career continued with the command of various ships in the Baltic and Black Seas. From 1812 to 1816 he commanded the frigate Minerva and from 1817 to 1819 the frigate Flora, both in the Black Sea Fleet. During 1812 he met on Macquarie Island, half-way between New Zealand and Antarctica, Richard Siddins, the Australian captain of the ship Campbell Macquarie.

First Russian Antarctic expedition

When Emperor Alexander I authorized an expedition to the south polar region in 1819, the authorities selected Bellingshausen to lead it as an experienced captain and explorer, and a prominent cartographer. The expedition was intended to explore the Southern Ocean and to find land in the proximity of the South Pole. The preparation work on the two ships, the 985-ton sloop-of-war Vostok ("East") and the 530-ton support vessel Mirny ("Peaceful") was carried out by Mikhail Lazarev, who had captained his own circumnavigation of the globe before. Bellingshausen became the captain of Vostok, and Lazarev captained Mirny. The journey started from Kronstadt on 4 June 1819. They stopped briefly in England, where Bellingshausen met with Sir Joseph Banks, the president of the Royal Society. Banks had sailed with Captain James Cook fifty years earlier and supplied the Russians with books and charts for their expedition.

Leaving Portsmouth on 5 September 1819 the expedition crossed the Antarctic Circle (the first to do so since Cook) on 26 January 1820 (New Style). On 27 January, the expedition discovered the Antarctic mainland approaching the Antarctic coast at a point with coordinates 69º21'28"S 2º14'50"W and seeing ice-fields there. The point in question lies within twenty miles of the Antarctic mainland. Bellingshausen's diary, his report to the Russian Naval Minister on 21 July 1821 and other documents, available in the Russian State Museum of the Arctic and Antarctic in Saint Petersburg, Russia, were carefully compared with the log-books of other claimants by the British polar historian A. G. E. Jones in his 1982 study Antarctica Observed. Jones concluded that Bellingshausen, rather than the Royal Navy's Edward Bransfield on 30 January 1820 or the American Nathaniel Palmer on 17 November 1820, was indeed the discoverer of the sought-after Terra Australis.

During the voyage Bellingshausen also visited Meretoto / Ship Cove in New Zealand, the South Shetland Islands, and discovered and named Peter I, Zavodovski, Leskov and Visokoi Islands, and a peninsula of the Antarctic mainland that he named the Alexander Coast, but that has more recently borne the designation of Alexander Island.

Bellingshausen and Lazarev managed to twice circumnavigate the continent and never lost each other from view. Thus, they disproved Cook's assertion that it was impossible to find land in the southern ice fields. The expedition also made discoveries and observations in the tropical waters of the Pacific Ocean.

Admiral

Returning to Kronstadt on 4 August 1821, Bellingshausen was made counter admiral. He fought in the Russo-Turkish War of 1828–1829 and attained the rank of vice admiral in 1830. In 1831, he published the book on his Antarctic travel, called Double Investigation of the Southern Polar Ocean and the Voyage Around the World.

Military governor of Kronstadt
He became the military governor of Kronstadt, the naval base at the approaches of St Petersburg, from 1839, and died there in 1852.

Legacy
Fabian Gottlieb von Bellingshausen is remembered in Russia as one of its greatest admirals and explorers. In the Antarctic, multiple geographical features and locations, named in honor of Bellingshausen, remind of his role in exploration of the southern polar region.

Monuments
There is a memorial stone of Bellingshausen on the previous site (on the ruins) of Lahhentagge/Lahetaguse manor in Ösel/Saaremaa.

There is a monument to Bellingshausen in Nikolayev, Ukraine, as well as in Rio de Janeiro, Brazil and in Montevideo, Uruguay.

There is a monument to Admiral Bellingshausen in Kronstadt, near Saint Petersburg in Russia.

Named in honour
 Bellingshausen Island (was) in the Aral Sea.
 Bellingshausen Island in the south Atlantic Ocean, part of the South Sandwich Islands
 Bellingshausen Sea in the Southern Ocean
 Bellingshausen Station, a Russian (former Soviet) base on King George Island, Antarctica
 Bellingshausen Plate, an ancient tectonic plate
 Bellinsgauzen, a crater on the far side of the Moon
 Faddey Islands in the Laptev Sea coastal region on the north Russian coast, named after Bellingshausen's first name in Russian
 Motu One (Society Islands), also known as Bellinghausen, an atoll in the Pacific Ocean
 A minor planet 3659 Bellingshausen, discovered by Soviet astronomer Lyudmila Chernykh in 1969

See also
 History of Antarctica
 List of Baltic German explorers

Notes

References

External links

 70South – information on Fabian von Bellingshausen
Двукратные изыскания в Южном Ледовитом океане и плавание вокруг света... Bellingshausen's book in Russian with details on the Antarctic expedition led by him
Biography (in Russian)
A map of his Antarctic expedition (in Russian), attention – all dates there are Julian
The page of Pilguse (Hoheneichen) manor from Estonian Manors Portal owned by the von Bellingshausens

1778 births
1852 deaths
People from Saaremaa Parish
People from Kreis Ösel
Baltic-German people
Explorers of Antarctica
Explorers from the Russian Empire
Estonian explorers
19th-century explorers
Imperial Russian Navy admirals
Cartographers from the Russian Empire
Circumnavigators of the globe
Ethnic German people from the Russian Empire
18th-century Estonian people
Russian and Soviet polar explorers
Recipients of the Order of St. George of the Fourth Degree
Recipients of the Order of St. Vladimir, 1st class
Recipients of the Order of St. Vladimir, 2nd class
Recipients of the Order of St. Vladimir, 3rd class
Recipients of the Order of the White Eagle (Russia)
Recipients of the Order of St. Anna, 1st class
Companions of the Order of the Bath
Order of Saint Louis recipients